Fade or Fading may refer to:

Science and technology
 Fading, a loss of signal strength at a radio receiver
 Color fade, the alteration of color by light
 Fade (audio engineering), a gradual change in sound volume
 Brake fade, in vehicle braking systems, a reduction in stopping power after repeated use
 FADE, a type of anti-piracy software

Arts and entertainment

Film and television
 Fade (filmmaking), a cinematographic technique
 Fade, a 2007 film starring Devon Odessa
 The Fades (TV series), a 2011 UK supernatural drama series
 "Fade" (Smallville), a television episode

Literature
 Fade (novel), a 1988 novel by Robert Cormier
 The Fade, a 2007 novel by Chris Wooding

Music
 Dynamics (music), the variation or change in volume in a piece of music

Performers
 Fade (band), a Japanese alternative rock band
 The Fades, a British indie rock band

Albums
 Fade (Remove Silence album) or the title song, 2010
 Fade (Yo La Tengo album), 2013
 Fade (Boris album), 2022

Songs
 "Fade" (Blue Angel song), 1980
 "Fade" (Jakwob song), 2013
 "Fade" (Kanye West song), 2016
 "Fade" (Kristine W song), 2009
 "Fade" (Lewis Capaldi song), 2017
 "Fade" (Staind song), 2001
 "Fading" (song), by Rihanna, 2010
 "Fade", by Alan Walker, 2014
 "Fade", by Basement from I Wish I Could Stay Here, 2011
 "Fade", by God Is an Astronaut from Ghost Tapes #10, 2021
 "Fade", by Gothminister from Anima Inferna, 2011
 "Fade", by Karnivool from Persona, 2001
 "Fade", by Northlane from Mesmer, 2017
 "Fade", by the Prom Kings, 2005
 "Fade", by Solu Music, 2001

Other entertainment
 Fade (lighting), in stage lighting, a gradual change in intensity of a light source
 Fade (video game), a 2001 point-and-click adventure game for the Pocket PC/Windows Mobile platform
 Fade Out – Fade In, a stage musical with a book and lyrics by Betty Comden and Adolph Green and music by Jule Styne

People
 Kris Fade (born 1980), Australian-Lebanese radio presenter, host, and musician
 Fade Goff (1780–1836), land agent and political figure in Prince Edward Island

Other uses
 Hi-top fade, a hairstyle
 Fade, a characteristic of a shot in golf stroke mechanics

See also
 Fade away (disambiguation)
 Fade in (disambiguation)
 Fade out (disambiguation)
 Fade to Black (disambiguation)
 Fade to Grey (disambiguation)
 Faded (disambiguation)
 Fader (disambiguation)
 Gradient (disambiguation)